Jati or JATI may refer to:

Places
Jati, Ceará, a city in Brazil
Jati Taluka, an administrative division of Sujawal District in Sindh, Pakistan
Jati Umra (Lahore), a town in Punjab, Pakistan
Jati Umra (Amritsar), a village in Punjab, India

Other uses
Jāti, a term for the thousands of clans, tribes, communities and sub-communities in India
Jāti (Buddhism), the arising of a new living entity
Jati (game), a board game from the 3M bookshelf game series
Jati (or Jatu or Jataki), a dialect of the Haryanvi language
Teak, the Indonesian name for the hardwood tree
Jatimatic, a Finnish 9 mm submachine gun
Jati (music), a rhythmic pattern in Indian classical music
JATI, or rather Jalur Tiga is an NGO in Malaysia